Angst is a 1976 Norwegian thriller film directed by Oddvar Bull Tuhus, starring Svein Scharffenberg and Eva Sevaldson. Tove (Sevaldson) is babysitting when she receives a threatening phone call.

External links
 
 Angst at Filmweb.no (Norwegian)

1976 films
1970s thriller films
Norwegian thriller films
Films directed by Oddvar Bull Tuhus
1970s Norwegian-language films